This is a list of Indian football transfers in the winter transfer window 2012–13 by club.

I-League

Air India

In:

 

Out:

Churchill Brothers

In:

Out:

Dempo

In:

 

Out:

East Bengal

In:

 

Out:

Mohun Bagan

In:

 
 

Out:

Mumbai

In:

Out:

Pailan Arrows

In:

Out:

Salgaocar

In:

 
 

Out:

Shillong Lajong

In:

Out:

Sporting Goa

In:

Out:

United Sikkim

In:

Out:

References

2012–13
Transfers
India